Leroy Anthony Hill Jr. (born June 23, 1956) is an American former professional football player who was a wide receiver in the National Football League (NFL), playing 10 seasons for the Dallas Cowboys. He played college football at Stanford University.

Early years
Hill was a high school quarterback at Long Beach Polytechnic High School, where he followed in the footsteps of an earlier-day record passer, Gene Washington. He broke most of Washington's high school passing records, and then followed him to Stanford University, where he was converted into a wide receiver, and again broke most of Washington's receiving records.

As a senior, he had an ankle injury against Penn State University, that forced him to miss the University of Michigan game and be limited in the next two contests.

He ranks eleventh on Stanford's records with 2,225 career receiving yards. He also had 140 receptions, 18 touchdowns and graduated with a 3.3 GPA in Political Science at the age of 20. He was inducted into the Stanford Athletic Hall of Fame.

Professional career

Dallas Cowboys
Hill was selected by the Dallas Cowboys in the third round (62nd overall) of the 1977 NFL Draft. He started his career as a punt returner and backup wide receiver, winning a championship ring with the Cowboys when they defeated the Denver Broncos 27-10 in Super Bowl XII.

The following season he became a starting wide receiver over the more-experienced Golden Richards and Butch Johnson.
At the end of the season, he made the Pro Bowl, after catching 46 passes for 823 yards and 6 touchdowns, while helping the team to their second consecutive Super Bowl appearance.  In Dallas' 35–31 Super Bowl XIII loss to the Pittsburgh Steelers, he caught 2 passes for 49 yards and a touchdown.

Known for his quick speed and big play ability, Coach Tom Landry called him “Our Home Run Hitter.  I’ve never seen a guy who could adjust to a ball in mid-air like Tony. He is a very explosive player---the type who can turn a short play into a big play in a hurry, because he has excellent running ability and speed.”

In 1979, he and Drew Pearson—along with Tony Dorsett—helped the Cowboys become the first team in NFL history to have two 1,000-yards wide receivers and a 1,000-yard running back, when he recorded 60 receptions, 1,062 yards and 10 touchdowns. Pearson and Hill also became the first wide receiver tandem in Cowboys history, to record 1,000-yard receiving seasons in the same year.

Hill became the number one receiver when Pearson retired after the 1983 season. His best season statistically came in 1985, where he caught 74 passes for 1100 receiving yards and 7 touchdowns. He eventually became one of the top wide receivers in the NFL from 1978 to 1985, and was dubbed the "Thrill" and "Dial 80", because of his explosiveness and ability to make big plays. A three-time Pro Bowl selection, during his ten-year career with the Cowboys, Hill led the team in both receptions and yardage for nine straight years. He never played in a Super Bowl again, but played in 10 more postseason games. One of the better performances in his career was in a 1982 divisional playoff game against the Tampa Bay Buccaneers, when he caught 7 passes for 142 yards in the Cowboys' 38–0 win.

He was waived by the Cowboys in 1987 at the start of training camp. His 8,072 total yards (rushing and receiving), ranks him fifth in the Cowboys All-Time list in that category, behind Hall of Famers Tony Dorsett, Emmitt Smith and Michael Irvin and  tight end Jason Witten.

At the time he ranked first in receiving yards, second in receiving touchdowns and second in receptions in Dallas Cowboys history.

San Francisco 49ers
On July 24, 1987, the San Francisco 49ers outbid the Los Angeles Rams for his services, but he never played another regular season game, after he was released on September 7.

Hill finished his 10 NFL seasons with 479 receptions for 7,988 yards and 51 touchdowns in 142 games.  He also had 26 100-yard receiving games, rushed for 84 yards, returned 27 punts for 268 yards, and gained 96 yards on 4 kickoff returns.
For his career, he averaged 16.1 yards per touch and 16.7 yards per reception.

Television appearances
In 2000, Hill appeared as a contestant on the short-lived game show Greed. He did not win any money after he got sacked on his $500,000 question as the team's captain. The question was: Which four and their affiliates have the highest global market share? The seven choices were General Motors, Ford, Honda, Volkswagen, Hyundai, Toyota, and BMW. Honda, BMW and Hyundai were the incorrect answers.

On June 23, 2011 (his birthday), Hill appeared on Good Morning Texas to promote the Market Street Allen USA Celebration, a Fourth of July celebration held annually the last weekend of June in his hometown, Allen, Texas. In honor of headline entertainer Lou Gramm, Hill showcased his singing voice by performing a small portion of one of Foreigner's hit songs, "Hot Blooded".

Broadcasting
Hill was the color commentator for ArenaBowl V on Prime Network and was the color commentator for America One's Canadian Football League broadcasts during the Canadian Media Guild strike. He also serves as a color commentator on the Compass Media Networks for NFL and college football.

Personal life
Hill is the CEO of Legends Sports Promotions, Inc., a company that raises funds for charitable organizations through celebrity basketball, softball, and football games as well as golf tournaments. It also manages athletes for motivational and promotional events. He is currently employed by the City of Allen Parks and Recreation Department as a Resource Development Manager.

Hill and his wife Millie have four children.

References

1956 births
Living people
American football wide receivers
Arena football announcers
Canadian Football League announcers
College football announcers
Dallas Cowboys players
National Football League announcers
National Conference Pro Bowl players
Stanford Cardinal football players
Contestants on American game shows
People from Allen, Texas
Players of American football from San Diego
Players of American football from Texas
Sportspeople from the Dallas–Fort Worth metroplex
Long Beach Polytechnic High School alumni